Mesetas is a town and municipality in the Meta Department, Colombia.

References
 Mesetas census results 2005 
 Mesetas municipal website 

Municipalities of Meta Department